Leptodius is a genus of crabs in the family Xanthidae, containing the following species:

 Leptodius australis Ward, 1936
 Leptodius davaoensis Ward, 1941
 Leptodius efferens Rathbun, 1907
 Leptodius exaratus (H. Milne Edwards, 1834)
 Leptodius gracilis (Dana, 1852)
 Leptodius hombronii (Lucas, 1853)
 Leptodius nigromaculatus Serene, 1962
 Leptodius nudipes (Dana, 1852)
 Leptodius philippinensis Ward, 1941
 Leptodius planus Ward, 1934
 Leptodius sanguineus (H. Milne Edwards, 1834)
 Leptodius waialuanus Rathbun, 1906

References

Xanthoidea